Sir Michael Parkinson  (born 28 March 1935) is an English broadcaster, journalist and author. He presented his television talk show Parkinson from 1971 to 1982 and from 1998 to 2007, as well as other talk shows and programmes both in the UK and internationally. He has also worked in radio. He has been described by The Guardian as "the great British talkshow host".

Early life 
Michael Parkinson was born on Thursday, 28 March 1935 in the village of Cudworth, near Barnsley, then in the West Riding of Yorkshire (since 1974 included  in the new metropolitan county of South Yorkshire). The son of a miner, he was educated at Barnsley Grammar School after passing the eleven-plus and in 1951 passed two O-Levels: in art and English language. He was a club cricketer, and both he and his opening partner at Barnsley Cricket Club, Dickie Bird, had trials for Yorkshire together with Geoffrey Boycott. He once kept Boycott out of the Barnsley Cricket Club team by scoring a century and 50 in two successive matches. A Michael Parkinson World XI played at the Scarborough Festival between 1988 and 1990.

Parkinson began as a journalist on local newspapers straight after leaving school. He worked as a features writer for the Manchester Guardian, working alongside Michael Frayn, and later on the Daily Express in London. In the course of his two years' National Service, which began in July 1955, he received a commission as an officer in the Royal Army Pay Corps, becoming the youngest captain in the British Army at the time. He saw active service in Egypt in the Suez Crisis as a British Army press liaison officer.

Career

Television 
During the 1960s, Parkinson moved into television, working on current affairs programmes for the BBC and Manchester-based Granada Television. He was one of the reporters and presenters on the five-times-a-week daily news magazine show Twenty-Four Hours on BBC1 from March 1966 until January 1968. From 1969 he presented Granada's Cinema, a late-night film review programme, (which included his first star interview with Laurence Olivier), before in July 1971 presenting his eponymous BBC series Parkinson, which ran until April 1982 and from January 1998 until December 2007, leaving the BBC for ITV1 midway through the second run. By his own reckoning, he has interviewed 2,000 of the world's celebrities. Parkinson was one of the original line-up of TV-am in 1983, with Angela Rippon, Anna Ford, David Frost and Robert Kee. Parkinson presented the weekend edition of the programme until February 1984 before leaving. 

He also became host of Thames Television's Give Us a Clue from Michael Aspel from 1984, while in 1985, he stood in for Barry Norman as presenter of Film 85.

In 1987 and 1988, Parkinson hosted 15 episodes of Parkinson One to One for Yorkshire Television, a series of interview programmes which continued in the style of his BBC talk show but with each episode dedicated to a single celebrity guest.

On Halloween 1992, Parkinson appeared as himself in the television drama Ghostwatch as the studio link during a fictional, apparently live, paranormal investigation. However, the cinéma vérité style in which it was shot led to complaints from viewers who believed it depicted real events. From 1995 to 1999, he hosted the BBC One daytime programme Going for a Song. He again played himself in Richard Curtis's 2003 romantic comedy, Love Actually, interviewing the character Billy Mack, played by Bill Nighy. From 31 January to 3 February 2007, Parkinson presented "Symphony at the Movies" at Sydney Opera House, where he shared stories about his interviews with movie stars and introduced music from films. In October 2003, Parkinson had a controversial interview with Meg Ryan while she was in the UK to promote In the Cut, calling it his most difficult television moment.

On 26 June 2007, Parkinson announced his retirement:

In 2007, Parkinson appeared in the Australian soap Neighbours as himself. On 24 November 2007, during recording of the final regular edition of his ITV chat show, broadcast on 16 December, Parkinson fought back tears as he was given an ovation. The last artist to perform on his show was regular guest Jamie Cullum. As of December 2008, Parkinson holds 458 credits as a presenter on his own and with others.

Parkinson was a flagship of the BBC's prime time schedule, attracting top names before the chat show circuit was part of the promotional mill. He was able to interview wartime variety stars while attracting up-and-coming comedians such as Billy Connolly. He was not afraid to allow an interviewee time to be themself, sometimes, as with Fred Astaire, Orson Welles, Sir Alec Guinness, Sir Paul McCartney, Muhammad Ali, George Michael, Madonna, John Cleese and Mel Gibson, devoting an entire programme to a guest who was considered especially noteworthy.  Parkinson stated that 'If I could save one interview from the thousands I have done, it would be the one-man show with Professor Jacob Bronowski.'

On 18 December 2003 he addressed the second Bradman Oration in Brisbane.

He stated that the most remarkable man he ever interviewed was Muhammad Ali, and regrets never having interviewed Frank Sinatra or Sir Don Bradman.

Parkinson returned to hosting television in November 2012 with his new show Parkinson: Masterclass on Sky Arts.

Radio 
Parkinson took over BBC Radio 4's Desert Island Discs for the 1986 series after the 1985 death of its creator, Roy Plomley, whose widow was unhappy with Parkinson replacing him. After six shows, he was criticised by the BBC Board of Management for "a Yorkshire bias in the choice of castaways" despite the fact that only one of his guests was born in the county. Parkinson claimed that the criticism was "a rearguard action by the establishment against the perceived desecration of an institution by an outsider". Parkinson stayed for three years until handing duties over to Sue Lawley.

Between 1994 and 1996 he hosted Parkinson on Sport on BBC Radio Five Live. Between 1996 and 2007, he presented a morning show on BBC Radio 2 called Parkinson's Sunday Supplement; it featured newspaper and entertainment summaries with the help of journalists and a lengthy interview with a media personality. These were interspersed with music that demonstrated his penchant for jazz and big-band. In October 2007, a few months after announcing his retirement from his television series, Parkinson said his radio show would also end. The last programme was broadcast on Sunday 2 December 2007.  As an interim Clive Anderson presented the programme during December/January and Eamonn Holmes during February and Fiona Bruce during March. Michael Ball replaced him until Terry Wogan moved to Sunday mornings to present Weekend Wogan. Parkinson presented a mid-morning programme on London's LBC Newstalk 97.3FM. He was considered responsible for promotion of jazz singers to a more mainstream audience during the run of his BBC radio show.

Writing 
Parkinson's first article for the Sunday Times Colour Section, 'Living in a Museum' (about the Suffolk village of Lavenham) appeared on 8 July 1962. In 1965 The Sunday Times invited Parkinson to write a regular sports column, drawing on characters in his days in cricket and football.  These Sunday Times and, his articles for Punch magazine later formed the basis for two books, Cricket Mad and Football Daft. In the 1980s, Parkinson wrote a series of children's books called The Woofits about a family of anthropomorphic dog-like creatures in the fictional Yorkshire coal-mining village of Grimeworth. The books led to a TV series, which he narrated. He wrote a sports column for the Daily Telegraph and is president of the Sports Journalists' Association.

His book Parky: My Autobiography was published on 2 October 2008. In April 2009, Parkinson wrote about the recently deceased Jade Goody in the Radio Times. He described Goody as "barely educated, ignorant and puerile," adding, "When we clear the media smokescreen from around her death, what we're left with is a woman who came to represent all that's paltry and wretched about Britain today." Bishop Jonathan Blake, who had presided over Goody's wedding, took exception to Parkinson's comments.

Other work 
In 1971, Parkinson was nominated as a candidate for the position of Rector of the University of Dundee. In one of the closest-ever contests for that position, he was very narrowly defeated by incumbent Peter Ustinov after two recounts. The result was controversial, as it was alleged earlier results indicated Parkinson had won, and a further recount should have taken place to confirm the result. As a result, pressure grew for the poll to be rerun. While the university decreed that the original result was to stand, a new poll was organised by the Students' Association, which also featured the candidature of a goat. However, this time Ustinov won a decisive victory over Parkinson, the goat, and Paul Foot.

On 29 September 2008, Parkinson launched his website, which included online interviews with Nelson Mandela and British comedian Rory Bremner. The site also includes a blog, giving Parkinson's views on news events as well as information about his compilation album, Michael Parkinson: My Life In Music, featuring favourite songs performed by Frank Sinatra, Michael Bublé, Dionne Warwick and others.

Parkinson gave the keynote address in Sydney on Australia Day 2011, the first non-Australian to do so. Parkinson used the publicity surrounding his Australia Day appearance to promote the abolition of the Australian monarchy.

After finishing his talk show, Parkinson appeared in commercials for SunLife Guaranteed Over 50 Plan life insurance, stating that he likes "its no-nonsense approach to business". His role in advertising the scheme was criticised by financial journalist Martin Lewis, who argued in 2012 that the plan was poor value for customers.

In August 2014, Parkinson was one of 200 public figures who were signatories to a letter to The Guardian expressing their hope that Scotland would vote to remain part of the United Kingdom in September's referendum on that issue.

Views 

In May 2009, Parkinson bemoaned the state of TV generally, saying he was "fed up with the rise of celebrities hosting shows, ridiculously titled documentaries and property shows", saying  "In my television paradise there would be no more property programmes, no more police-chasing-yobbos-in-cars programmes and, most of all and please God, no more so-called documentary shows with titles like My 20-Ton Tumour, My Big Fat Head, Wolf Girl, Embarrassing Illnesses and The Fastest Man on No Legs." On 11 October 2010, Parkinson appeared on Richard Bacon's Radio 5 Live show where he was particularly critical of comedian and actor Russell Brand, saying: "I don't see the point of him."

In 2013, Parkinson again criticised the course British television had taken, comparing series such as The One Show unfavourably with the broadcasting of the recently deceased Alan Whicker and David Frost, as well as stating the "cult of youth" had "distorted the standards". Parkinson spoke fondly of the time when "producers were unencumbered by such irksome obstacles as compliance, health and safety and frustrating commissioning procedures". Alex Jones, presenter of The One Show, rejected Parkinson's criticism.

Parkinson has declined to apologise to Helen Mirren over an interview he conducted in 1975, where he implied that serious actors could not have large breasts. Mirren later described him as a "sexist old fart". On Piers Morgan's Life Stories, Morgan suggested the comments were sexist. Parkinson replied: "Well, maybe. But nobody got hurt, nobody died."

Personal life 
On 22 August 1959, he married Mary Agnes Heneghan, who was from Doncaster. Under her new name, Mary Parkinson was one of the presenters of the Thames TV daytime show Good Afternoon and briefly presented Parkinson in the 1970s. They have three children. In the 1970s, Parkinson campaigned in support of birth control, having had a vasectomy in 1972 to allow his wife to stop taking the Pill. 

He is a cricket fan, and in 1990 hosted a World XI team against Yorkshire. Parkinson and his wife live in Bray, Berkshire. He met his friend Michel Roux when rowing down the River Thames on a Sunday to his then pub, the Waterside Inn. Parkinson formerly owned a Michelin Star restaurant near his home in Berkshire. In an interview with Irish broadcaster Gay Byrne on the RTÉ religious programme The Meaning of Life, he stated that he was an agnostic atheist.

Honours and awards 
In 1999, he received an honorary doctorate from the University of Lincoln and he also received an honour from the University of Huddersfield in 2008. He was invested as a Commander of the Order of the British Empire (CBE) by Prince Charles in November 2000 for services to broadcasting, having been honoured in the 2000 Birthday Honours. Parkinson was made a Knight Bachelor in the 2008 New Year's Honours List; he remarked that he was "not the type to get a knighthood" coming as he did "from Barnsley. They give it to anyone nowadays."

Parkinson was ranked eighth in a list of the 100 Greatest British Television Programmes drawn up by the British Film Institute in 2000, voted for by industry professionals. In April 2006, Parkinson was awarded honorary patronage of the University Philosophical Society of Trinity College Dublin. He was voted number 20 in ITV's "TV's 50 Greatest Stars". On 4 June 2008 he was knighted by the Queen at Buckingham Palace.

On 11 November 2008, he became the first Chancellor of Nottingham Trent University; the role includes representing the university and conferring degrees at graduation ceremonies. Upon receiving the honour he said, "I am honoured to be offered the chancellorship at Nottingham Trent University. In television I have always worked with young, ambitious people and I am keen to be involved in this university which helps to realise the aspirations of the young. It will also give me an opportunity to see what I missed!". Parkinson has served as president of the Sports Journalists' Association of Great Britain since 2005, the largest national organisation of sports journalists in the world.

In 2014 he agreed to become patron of the Reg Bartley Cricket Club in Sydney, Australia.

In popular culture 

Parkinson is on the cover of the 1973 Paul McCartney and Wings album Band on the Run. Paul McCartney told Parkinson that he would appear on his show if Parkinson appeared on the album cover, although it was not until 1999 that McCartney fulfilled his promise.

In 2005, Parkinson appeared with comedian Peter Kay on the music video of the re-released "Is This the Way to Amarillo" for Comic Relief, which became a number one single.

Parkinson was featured in Irregular Webcomic! number 1697.

In 2008, Parkinson was interviewed by Jeremy Clarkson on Top Gear (Series 12, Episode 1).

References

External links 
 
 Michael Parkinson  and the MBC's Encyclopedia of Television
 

1935 births
Living people
20th-century British Army personnel
20th-century British journalists
BBC Radio 2 presenters
Best Entertainment Performance BAFTA Award (television) winners
British military personnel of the Suez Crisis
Commanders of the Order of the British Empire
English autobiographers
English memoirists
English children's writers
English game show hosts
English male journalists
English radio presenters
English sportswriters
English television presenters
English television talk show hosts
Knights Bachelor
People educated at Holgate School, Barnsley
People from Cudworth, South Yorkshire
Royal Army Pay Corps officers
Military personnel from Yorkshire
Television personalities from South Yorkshire